The 8th constituency of the Seine-Maritime (French: Huitième circonscription de la Seine-Maritime) is a French legislative constituency in the Seine-Maritime département. Like the other 576 French constituencies, it elects one MP using the two-round system, with a run-off if no candidate receives over 50% of the vote in the first round.

Description

The 8th Constituency of the Seine-Maritime covers Le Havre as well as Gonfreville-l'Orcher which was added as a result of the 2010 redistricting of French legislative constituencies.

The seat has historically been a stronghold of the French Communist Party, 2012 is the only recent election in which another party won, in this case the Socialist Party.

Assembly Members

Election results

2022

2017

 
 
 
 
 
 
 
|-
| colspan="8" bgcolor="#E9E9E9"|
|-

2012

 
 
 
 
 
|-
| colspan="8" bgcolor="#E9E9E9"|
|-
 
 

 
 
 
 

* Withdrew before the 2nd round.

2007

 
 
 
 
 
 
|-
| colspan="8" bgcolor="#E9E9E9"|
|-

2002

 
 
 
 
 
 
 
|-
| colspan="8" bgcolor="#E9E9E9"|
|-

1997

 
 
 
 
 
 
|-
| colspan="8" bgcolor="#E9E9E9"|
|-

References

8